René Ifrah is an American actor born in Germany and raised in Brooklyn, New York City. He is best known for his role as Bibi Hamed on the Showtime series Homeland, for which he was nominated for a Screen Actors Guild Award (2016). He is also known for his recurring roles on Showtime's crime drama Sneaky Pete, where he played the character of Wali (2017–2018); the Showtime Drama series The Affair (2017); and the Showtime comedy series Nurse Jackie (2009–2011).

Early life 
Rene Ifrah was born in Frankfurt, Germany, and raised there and in Sicily until moving to Brooklyn, New York, with his family around the age of 10. He is of German, Sephardic, and Italian descent.

Career

Film 
After his film debut in a small part in the 2002 film Hart's War, starring Bruce Willis and Colin Farrell, Ifrah went on to co-star in the German ensemble film September as Ashraf, a Pakistani pizzeria owner in Hamburg, Germany, at odds with his German wife after the September 11 attacks. He then starred in the German film Grüße aus Kaschmir (2004), for which he won a Grimme-Preis (2005) for best ensemble. He then appeared in Beyond the Sea as well as The Taking of Pelham 123.

Television 
After guest starring roles on shows including NBC's Law & Order and Law & Order: Special Victims Unit, and American Broadcasting Company's Life on Mars, Ifrah landed a recurring role in the Showtime comedy series Nurse Jackie. 

He had a recurring role as Danny in the Starz miniseries Flesh and Bone before landing the part of Bibi Hamed for season five of the Showtime program Homeland.

Since Homeland, Ifrah has had further recurring parts on Showtime's The Affair and Sneaky Pete as well as additional guest appearances on Netflix's The Punisher and CBS's Blue Bloods and God Friended Me.

Filmography

Film

Television (selected roles)

Voiceover work

Awards and nominations

References

External links 
 
 

Jewish American male actors
American male film actors
21st-century American male actors
German emigrants to the United States
Living people
American male television actors
People from Brooklyn
Year of birth missing (living people)
21st-century American Jews